Phebalium verrucosum is a species of shrub that is endemic to New South Wales. It has branchlets densely covered with white scales, narrow elliptic, oblong or linear leaves covered with white scales on the lower side, and umbels of creamy white flowers with silvery or rust-coloured scales on the back of the petals.

Description
The upper surface of the leaves is warty and the lower surface is covered with silvery and rust-coloured scales. Flowering mainly occurs from September to November with sporadic flowering in April and June.

Taxonomy and naming
This species was first formally described in 1970 by Paul Wilson who gave it the name Phebalium squamulosum subsp. verrucosum and published the description in the journal Nuytsia. In 2014, Ian Telford and Jeremy Bruhl raised it to species status as Phebalium verrucosum in the journal Telopea. The specific epithet (verrucosum) means "covered with warts".

Distribution and habitat
Phebalium verrucosum grows in shrubby woodland and dry rainforest on the edge of gorges and rocky stream sides near the Macleay, Guy Fawkes and Nymboida rivers.

References

verrucosum
Flora of New South Wales
Plants described in 1970
Taxa named by Paul G. Wilson